Passalus interstitialis is a beetle of the Family Passalidae, native to western North America.

It was classified by Johann Friedrich von Eschscholtz in the early 19th century.

Gallery

External links

Passalidae
Beetles of North America
Insects of the United States
Fauna of the Western United States
Beetles described in 1829
Taxa named by Johann Friedrich von Eschscholtz